Hamdan v. Rumsfeld, 548 U.S. 557 (2006), is a case in which the Supreme Court of the United States held that military commissions set up by the Bush administration to try detainees at Guantanamo Bay violated both the Uniform Code of Military Justice (UCMJ) and the Geneva Conventions ratified by the U.S.

Hamdan raises several legal issues: Whether the United States Congress may pass legislation preventing the Supreme Court from hearing the case of an accused combatant before his military commission takes place; whether the special military commissions established by the executive branch violated federal law (including the UCMJ and treaty obligations); and whether courts can enforce the articles of the Geneva Conventions.

An unusual aspect of the case was an amicus brief filed by Senators Jon Kyl and Lindsey Graham, which presented an "extensive colloquy" added to the Congressional record as evidence that "Congress was aware" that the Detainee Treatment Act of 2005 would strip the Supreme Court of jurisdiction to hear cases brought by the Guantanamo detainees. Because these statements were not included in the December 21 debate at the time, Emily Bazelon of Slate magazine has argued that their brief was an attempt to mislead the court.

After hearing oral arguments on March 28, 2006, on June 29, 2006, the Court issued a 5–3 decision holding that it had jurisdiction; that the administration lacked either the constitutional power or congressional authorization to establish these particular military commissions; that, absent such authority, the military commissions had to comply with the "ordinary laws" of the U.S. and of war, which include the UCMJ and the Geneva Conventions incorporated therein; and that Hamdan's trial, having violated the rights and procedures under both bodies of law, was illegal.

Background

The plaintiff was Salim Ahmed Hamdan, a citizen of Yemen who worked as a bodyguard and chauffeur for Osama bin Laden. Hamdan had formerly worked in Afghanistan on an agricultural project that Bin Laden had developed. Hamdan was captured by militia forces during the invasion of Afghanistan in the fall of 2001 and turned over to the United States. In 2002, he was sent by the U.S. to its new Guantanamo Bay detention camp at its naval base in Cuba.

In July 2004, Hamdan was charged with conspiracy to commit terrorism, and the Bush administration made arrangements to try him before a military commission, established by the Department of Defense under Military Commission Order No. 1 of March 21, 2002. He was assigned a defense counsel, LCDR Charles D. Swift from the Navy JAG, who with a legal team filed a petition for Hamdan in US District Court for a writ of habeas corpus, challenging the constitutionality of the military commission, and saying that it lacked the protections required under the Geneva Conventions and United States Uniform Code of Military Justice.

Following the U.S. Supreme Court ruling in Hamdi v. Rumsfeld (2004), which established that detainees had the right of habeas corpus to challenge their detention, Hamdan was granted a review before the Combatant Status Review Tribunal. It determined that he was eligible for detention by the United States as an enemy combatant or person of interest.

The defendants in this case included many United States government officials allegedly responsible for Hamdan's detention; the short name of the case includes only the first-named defendant, then-Secretary of Defense Donald Rumsfeld.

District and Appeals Court rulings
After reviewing Hamdan's habeas petition, Judge James Robertson of the United States District Court for the District of Columbia ruled in the detainee's favor. He found that the United States could not hold a military commission unless it was first shown that the detainee was not a prisoner of war.

On July 15, 2005, a United States Court of Appeals for the District of Columbia Circuit three-judge panel: A. Raymond Randolph, John Roberts and Stephen F. Williams, unanimously reversed the decision of the District Court. Judge Randolph, who wrote the decision, cited the following reasons for the legality of the military commission:
 Military commissions are legitimate forums to try enemy combatants because they have been approved by Congress.
 The Geneva Convention is a treaty between nations and as such it does not confer individual rights and remedies.
 Even if the Geneva Convention could be enforced in U.S. courts, it would not be of assistance to Hamdan at the time because the war against al-Qaeda was not between two countries, and the Convention guarantees only a certain standard of judicial procedure—a "competent tribunal"—without speaking to the jurisdiction in which the prisoner must be tried.
 Under the terms of the Geneva Convention, al Qaeda and its members are not covered.
 Congress authorized such activity by statute.
 The judicial branch of the United States government cannot enforce the Convention, thus invalidating Hamdan's argument that he cannot be tried until after his prisoner-of-war status is determined.

Supreme Court decision

On November 7, 2005, the Supreme Court granted certiorari to hear the case. The petition was filed on behalf of Hamdan by Neal Katyal of Georgetown University Law Center and Lt. Commander Charles Swift of the U.S. Navy, an alumnus of Seattle University School of Law. The Seattle law firm Perkins Coie provided the additional legal counsel for Hamdan.

The case was argued before the court on March 28, 2006. Katyal argued on behalf of Hamdan, and Paul Clement, the Solicitor General of the United States, argued on behalf of the government. Chief Justice Roberts recused himself because he had previously ruled on this case as part of the three judge panel on the United States Court of Appeals for the District of Columbia Circuit. Critics called for Justice Antonin Scalia to recuse himself, since he had made allegedly improper comments about the decision of the case prior to hearing oral arguments ("I'm not about to give this man who was captured in a war a full jury trial. I mean it's crazy") but he chose not to do so.

The Supreme Court announced its decision on June 29, 2006. The Court reversed the ruling of the Court of Appeals, holding that President George W. Bush did not have authority to set up the war crimes tribunals and finding the special military commissions illegal under both military justice law and the Geneva Conventions.

Stevens' opinion for the Court

Associate Justice John Paul Stevens wrote the opinion for the Court, which commanded a majority only in part.

The Stevens opinion began with the issue of jurisdiction, denying the U.S. government's motion to dismiss under Section 1005 of the Detainee Treatment Act of 2005 (DTA), which gave the D.C. Circuit Court of Appeals "exclusive" jurisdiction to review decisions of cases being tried before military commissions. Congress did not include language in the DTA that might have precluded Supreme Court jurisdiction, making the government's argument to the Court unpersuasive. The government's argument that Schlesinger v. Councilman 420 U.S. 738 (1975) precludes Supreme Court review was similarly rejected. Councilman applied to a member of the U.S. military who was being tried before a military "court-martial". In contrast, Hamdan is not a member of the U.S. military, and would be tried before a military "commission", not a court-martial. To the court, the more persuasive precedent was Ex parte Quirin, in which the court recognized its duty to enforce relevant Constitutional protections by convening a special Term and expediting review of a trial by military convention. The opinion explicitly stated that, because DTA did not bar it from considering the petition, it was unnecessary to decide whether laws unconditionally barring habeas corpus petitions would unconstitutionally violate the Suspension Clause.

The opinion then addressed the substantive issues of the case. It explicitly did not decide whether the President possessed the Constitutional power to convene military commissions like the one created to try Hamdan. Even if he possessed such power, those tribunals would either have to be sanctioned by the "laws of war", as codified by Congress in Article 21 of the Uniform Code of Military Justice (UCMJ), or authorized by statute. As to the statutory authorization, there is nothing in the Authorization for Use of Military Force (AUMF) "even hinting" at expanding the President's war powers beyond those enumerated in Art. 21. Instead, the AUMF, the UCMJ, and the DTA "at most acknowledge" the President's authority to convene military commissions only where justified by the exigencies of war, but still operating within the laws of war.

As to the laws of war, to the majority these necessarily include the UCMJ and the Geneva Conventions, each of which require more protections than the military commission provides. The UCMJ, Art. 36 (b), requires that rules applied in courts-martial and military commissions be "uniform insofar as practicable".  Stevens found several substantial deviations, including:
 The defendant and the defendant's attorney may be forbidden to view certain evidence used against the defendant; the defendant's attorney may be forbidden to discuss certain evidence with the defendant;
 Evidence judged to have any probative value may be admitted, including hearsay, unsworn live testimony, and statements gathered through torture; and
 Appeals are not heard by courts, but only within the Executive Branch (with an exception not here relevant).

These deviations made the commissions violate the UCMJ.

The majority also found that the procedures in question violate the "at least" applicable Common Article 3 of the Geneva Conventions. It found that the D.C. Court of Appeals erred in concluding that the Conventions did not apply:
 It erroneously relied on Johnson v. Eisentrager, which does not legally control in Hamdan's case because there was then no deviation between the procedures used in the tribunal and those used in courts-martial;
 It erroneously ruled that the Geneva Conventions do not apply because Art. 3 affords minimal protection to combatants "in the territory of" a signatory; and
 Those minimal protections include being tried by a "regularly constituted court", which the military commission is not.
Because the military commission does not meet the requirements of the Uniform Code of Military Justice or of the Geneva Convention, it violates the laws of war and therefore cannot be used to try Hamdan.

The Court did not hear the question that had decided the district court opinion, namely that Hamdan was entitled to a GCIII Art. 5 hearing instead of a Combatant Status Review Tribunal.

Plurality sections
Because Justice Anthony Kennedy did not join Stevens' opinion as to several parts, largely on the grounds of judicial parsimony (that is, having decided that the military commissions had no foundation, the core question of the case was decided and the Court did not need to go further), those sections were without a majority in support.

In one of these sections, Stevens addressed the issue of whether military commissions can try conspiracy charges. He argued that military commissions are not courts of general jurisdiction, which are able to try any crime; that the court has traditionally held that offenses against the law of war are triable by military commission only when they are clearly defined as war crimes by statute or strong common law precedent (cf. Quirin). Finally, he found that there was no support in statute or court precedent for law-of-war military commissions trying charges of "conspiracy", either in the Geneva Conventions, in the earlier Hague Conventions or at the Nuremberg Trials.

Addressing the dissents
As is common in opinions to which there are dissents, Stevens' opinion addressed the major arguments in dissent. For example:
 The majority opinion says that Justice Scalia's argument concerning the jurisdiction-stripping statute (section 1005e(1)) ignores the effective date provision of that very statute (section 1005(h)).
 The majority opinion says that the government's contention that the war started on September 11, 2001, undercuts Justice Thomas' argument that it started in 1996.
 The majority opinion notes that language in the Congressional Record that the Scalia dissent cites was inserted into the Record after the legislation had been enacted, by Senators Lindsey Graham (R-SC) and Jon Kyl (R-AZ), and includes falsified quotations attributed to other persons.

Breyer's concurrence
Justice Breyer wrote a one-page concurring opinion, joined by Justices Kennedy, Souter, and Ginsburg. Breyer contended that the commissions are not necessarily categorically prohibited, as long as Congress approves them:

Kennedy's concurrence

Justice Kennedy wrote an opinion concurring in part, joined as to parts I and II by Justices Souter, Ginsburg, and Breyer.

In Part One of Kennedy's concurrence, he raises his concern for the separation of powers; specifically, how one branch can control all the elements of a case, including avenues of review and appeal.

Part Two describes the differences between the procedures of the military commissions and the procedures prescribed by the UCMJ (fewer jury members, different rules of evidence, etc.).  These differences demonstrate that the commissions do not operate under the rules of military courts-martial, and raise issues of neutrality with respect to the military judges involved. The negation of fairness safeguards renders the commission a judicial entity which is not a "regularly constituted court", as required in the Geneva Convention. In sum, Kennedy writes that the commission exceeds congressional bounds, though the Congress is free to re-write the law as they see fit.

The third and final Part lists some of Kennedy's reservations. He would not say that the defendant must be present at all stages of the trial. There should be a reluctance to consider the applicability of Article 75 of Protocol I, since the U.S. never signed it and thus it is not binding. Kennedy writes that he feels it was not necessary to delve into the validity of the conspiracy charge, and he expresses no view on the merits of the other limitations of the commission noted in Part V of the Decision.

Scalia's dissent
Justice Scalia wrote a dissenting opinion that focuses primarily on issues of jurisdiction, and was joined by Justices Thomas and Alito.

Scalia calls the Court's conclusion to hear the case "patently erroneous". His first argument relies on the part of the Detainee Treatment Act (DTA) (effective December 30, 2005) that states "[N]o court, justice, or judge shall have jurisdiction to hear or consider an application for a writ of habeas corpus filed by or on behalf of an alien detained by the Department of Defense at Guantanamo Bay, Cuba." §1005(e)(1), 119 Stat. 2742. Scalia's opinion is that this clause suffices to deny the Supreme Court jurisdiction over the case, calling the majority's reading  of the effectiveness provisions of §1005(h), a "mess". He cites Bruner v. United States and other cases granting "immediate effect in pending cases, absent an explicit statutory reservation". He wrote that in interpreting the language in the DTA, the majority ignored Supreme Court precedents which established that a statute excluding jurisdiction applies to pending cases unless it has clear language saying it does not. Scalia claimed that the majority had made this interpretation "for the flimsiest of reasons". He was referring to the majority's use of Senate floor debate records to bolster their interpretation, writing that it "makes no difference" that the language in support of his position was inserted into the Congressional Record after the law was voted upon. He also accuses the majority of ignoring the President's signing statement.

Furthermore, he anticipates that expanding the jurisdictions able to hear writs of habeas corpus from Guantanamo Bay would create excessive load on the court system.

In addition, Scalia states that the original military tribunal was not shown to be inadequate. Regarding the application of the Suspension Clause of the Constitution, Scalia points to Johnson v. Eisentrager.

In its second major argument, Scalia's opinion argues that petitioners such as Hamdan held outside the territorial jurisdiction of the United States lack the right to the writ of habeas corpus.  He points in a footnote to Hamdi v. Rumsfeld, under which he claims Hamdan "is already subject to indefinite detention" "after an adverse determination by his CSRT".

Finally, Justice Scalia chastises the Court for taking equity jurisdiction of the case and draws an analogy with Schlesinger v. Councilman, 420 U.S. 738 (1975). In that case, the Supreme Court declined passing judgment on the decision of a military court-martial before it finished its work; Scalia argues that likewise, the military commissions in Cuba have not yet ended their work regarding Hamdan and therefore should not be subject to judicial oversight.

Thomas's dissent
Justice Clarence Thomas read his dissent from the bench when the decision was announced, the first time he did so since his dissent in Stenberg v. Carhart, 530 U.S. 914 (2000).

In his dissent he asserted that the courts had no jurisdiction for this case for the reasons described in Scalia's dissent above; that Hamdan is an illegal combatant and therefore not protected by the Geneva convention; that the Geneva convention does not prohibit the special court council proposed; and that the President already had authority to set up the special court council proposed.

Citing his dissent in Hamdi v. Rumsfeld, Thomas briefly reprised the roles granted by the Constitution to the three different branches in time of war. He argued that under the framework established in Ex parte Quirin and Youngstown Sheet & Tube Co. v. Sawyer, President Bush's decision to try Hamdan before a military commission "is entitled to a heavy measure of deference", inasmuch as Congress had authorized the President to use all necessary and appropriate force to prevent future acts of terrorism when it passed the Authorization for Use of Military Force.

Thomas disagreed strongly with the plurality's determination that the legality of the charges against Hamdan are doubtful because he was charged "not with an overt act for which he was caught redhanded ... but with an 'agreement' the inception of which long predated ... the [relevant armed conflict]". He lambasted the plurality for second-guessing the Executive's judgment, arguing that the Court's disagreement was based upon "little more than its unsupported assertions" and constituted "an unprecedented departure from the traditionally limited role of the courts with respect to war and an unwarranted intrusion on executive authority". Thomas further disagreed with the plurality's assumption that the date of the enactment of the AUMF constituted the start of war, suggesting that Osama bin Laden's declaration of jihad in August 1996 could be considered a declaration of war. Under this view, the enactment by Congress of the AUMF did not mark the beginning of the conflict with al Qaeda, but rather authorized the Executive to use force to combat it. Additionally, Thomas wrote that under the common law of war, which is "flexible and evolutionary in nature", war courts are permitted a degree of latitude in their jurisdiction. In holding otherwise, the plurality failed to properly defer to the judgment of the Executive and military commanders.

Referring to the Court's recent decision in Rapanos v. United States, Thomas noted with some incredulity that while the Justices in the instant decision "disregard[ed] the commander-in-chief's wartime decisions", they had no trouble deferring to the judgment of the Corps of Engineers in upholding the agency's "wildly implausible conclusion that a storm drain is a tributary of the waters of the United States". He added that "It goes without saying that there is much more at stake here than storm drains."

Thomas likewise disagreed with the plurality's holding that even if the government had charged Hamdan with a crime that was clearly cognizable by military commission, the commission would still lack power to proceed because it does not comply with the terms of the UCMJ and the four Geneva Conventions signed in 1949. He again emphasized that the jurisdiction of military commissions is not prescribed by statute but is rather "adapted in each instance to the need that called it forth". Thomas argued that the Court's conclusion that Article 36 of the UCMJ amounts to an attempt by Congress to curb the Executive's power is "contrary to the text and structure of the UCMJ" and also inconsistent with prior decisions of the Court. Addressing Hamdan's claims under the Geneva Convention, Thomas argued that these are foreclosed by the Court's holding in Johnson v. Eisentrager, where the majority noted that the respondents could not assert "that anything in the Geneva Convention makes them immune from prosecution or punishment for war crimes". Further, even if Hamdan's claim under Common Article 3 was not foreclosed by Eisentrager, it is nevertheless meritless insofar as the President has accepted the determination of the Department of Justice that Common Article 3 of Geneva does not extend to al Qaeda detainees. Thomas asserted that the Court's duty in this instance to "defer to the President's understanding of the provision at issue" is made even more acute by the fact that he is acting pursuant to his authority as Commander-in-Chief.

Alito's dissent
In a seven page dissent, Alito sided with Thomas and Scalia's explanation of why they believe the courts had no jurisdiction for this case. He explained why he believed the military commission in this case was legal. Alito disagreed with the holding of the Court which found that military commissions did not meet the definition of "a regularly constituted court" as required in Common Article 3 of the Geneva Conventions. Alito argued that Common Article 3 was satisfied in Hamdan because the military commissions:
 qualify as courts,
 were appointed and established in accordance with domestic law, and
 any procedural improprieties that might occur in particular cases can be reviewed in those cases.

Alito wrote that the military commission was "regularly" or "properly" constituted, using the example of the various types of local, state, federal and international courts and how "although these courts are 'differently constituted' and differ substantially in many other respects, they are all 'regularly constituted.'"

Alito stated that Geneva Convention Common Article 3 does not specifically rule out military commissions, and further points to the commentary in Article 66, which was the article the Court used in support of its opinion.  Alito argued that even if Common Article 3 recognizes a prohibition on "special tribunals", which Article 66 does prohibit, such a prohibition is not applicable to Hamdan's tribunal because the military commissions were "regular". Further, because the Bush Administration might conduct the hundreds of such tribunals according to the same procedures, Alito concluded that "it seems that petitioner's tribunal, like the hundreds of others respondents propose to conduct, is very much regular and not at all special."

Alito wrote that "the commissions were appointed, set up, and established pursuant to an order of the President, just like the commission in Ex parte Quirin, 317 U. S. 1 (1942), and the Court acknowledges that Quirin recognized that the statutory predecessor of  'preserved' the President's power 'to convene military commissions.'" Alito disagreed with Kennedy's assertion that "an acceptable degree of independence from the Executive is necessary to render a commission 'regularly constituted' by the standards of our Nation's system of justice", arguing that Kennedy "offers no support for this proposition (which in any event seems to be more about fairness or integrity than regularity)", and further arguing that the commission in Quirin was no different from the present case.

Finally, Alito wrote that the commission procedures as a whole do not provide a basis for deeming the commissions to be illegitimate.  He points to two procedural rules, which the Court found fault with: First, the rule "allowing the Secretary of Defense to change the governing rules 'from time to time; and second, the rule that "permits the admission of any evidence that would have 'probative value to a reasonable person.  Alito asserts these rules cannot make the commissions illegitimate.

On the first rule Alito argued that not all changes during the course of a trial prejudice the defendant, and that some may even help the defendant. In addition, "If a change is made and applied during the course of an ongoing proceeding and if the accused is found guilty, the validity of that procedure can be considered in the review proceeding for that case."

On the second rule, Alito argued that this rule does not violate the international standard incorporated into Common Article 3, because "rules of evidence differ from country to country" and "much of the world does not follow aspects of our evidence rules, such as the general prohibition against the admission of hearsay".

Reaction to the decision

The impact of the decision on the petitioner, Hamdan, was that he can still be tried; however, his trial must be in a court, such as a military court-martial, or possibly a commission that has court-like protections.

Shortly thereafter, the Military Commissions Act of 2006 may have raised again the issue of which court would hear cases such as Hamdan's. The U.S. Department of Justice has filed notice with several federal judges, and given notice to hundreds of detainees, that the habeas petitions of alien unlawful enemy combatants (or those whose status is to be determined) are not within the jurisdiction of those courts.

The passage and signing of the Act follows through on President Bush's expressed intention to get explicit Congressional authorization to use military tribunals. Press Secretary Tony Snow echoed the plan to appeal to Congress.

However, even among Senate Republicans, there were conflicting views. Senators Arlen Specter and Lindsey Graham (the latter a former military prosecutor) indicated Congress would work quickly to authorize tribunals, while influential Senator John Warner suggested a cautious and deliberative response. 

On July 7, 2006, the Secretary of Defense issued a memo "Application of Common Article 3 of the Geneva Conventions to the Treatment of Detainees in the Department of Defense". This may be the basis of a July 11, 2006, statement by the Bush administration that all detainees at Guantanamo Bay and in U.S. military custody everywhere are entitled to humane treatment under the Geneva Conventions. This declaration appears not to cover CIA detainees and is ambiguous with respect to the interpretation of Common Article 3 and the definition of "humane treatment".

There were some indications that the other detainees being held at facilities throughout the world (e.g., Bagram Air Base and black sites), might use the Supreme Court's ruling to challenge their treatment. Their reasoning may be that since the Geneva Conventions afforded protection to Hamdan, its other protections might be effective for them as well. Commentators expressed mixed opinions about the strength of this argument.

Implications for theories of executive power

The decision may have important implications for other disputes relating to the extent of executive power and the unitary executive theory. In particular, it may undermine the Bush administration's legal arguments for domestic wiretapping by the National Security Agency without warrants as required by the Foreign Intelligence Surveillance Act.

Charges dismissed/new charges
On June 5, 2007, Hamdan and Canadian youth Omar Khadr, had all charges against them dismissed. The judges presiding over their military commissions ruled that the Military Commissions Act did not give them the jurisdiction to try Hamdan and Khadr, because it only authorized the trial of "unlawful enemy combatants". Hamdan and Khadr's Combatant Status Review Tribunals, like those of all the other Guantanamo captives, had confirmed them as "enemy combatants".

In December 2007, a tribunal determined that Hamdan was an "unlawful enemy combatant". In August 2008, he was convicted by the military commission of the lesser of two charges and received a sentence of 66 months, reduced by time served to five and a half months. In November 2008, the US transferred him to Yemen, where he served his last month. After release, he joined his family in Sana. In October 2012, the US Appeals Court for the District of Columbia, overturned Hamdan's conviction, acquitting him of the charge.

See also
 List of United States Supreme Court cases, volume 548
 List of United States Supreme Court cases
 Rasul v. Bush
 Boumediene v. Bush

References

Further reading
 
 National Security Law for Policymakers and Law Students
 Human Rights First: 
 .
 .
 Testimony of Scott Silliman on Hamdan v. Rumsfeld: Establishing a Constitutional Process", U.S. Senate Committee on the Judiciary, July 11, 2006.

External links

Court documents
 
   
  
 Groups File Amicus Briefs in Case Involving Osama Bin Laden's Driver, Physicians for Human Rights
 Petition for a writ of certiorari: Brief for the respondents in opposition, US Department of Justice, December 2004.
  , U.S. Court of Appeals for the District of Columbia Circuit, July 15, 2005.
  BRIEF OF LEGAL SCHOLARS AND HISTORIANS AS AMICI CURIAE IN SUPPORT OF PETITIONER, SALIM AHMED HAMDAN, v DONALD H. RUMSFELD, SECRETARY OF DEFENSE, et al., No. 05-184.

Pentagon documents
 Department of Defense Military Commission Order No. 1, March 21, 2002

News reports, commentary
 High Court Rejects Detainee Tribunals, Washington Post, June 29, 2006.
 Hamdan v. Rumsfeld: The Supreme Court Affirms International Law, JURIST, June 30, 2006.
 Hamdan, Common Article 3 and the True Spirit of the Law of War, JURIST, July 3, 2006.
 U.S. Charges Yemeni Described as Bin Laden Bodyguard, Washington Post, July 14, 2004.
 Fourth Guantanamo Detainee Is Charged, Washington Post, July 14, 2004.
 Bin Laden driver charged in first Guantanamo hearing, USA Today, August 25, 2004.
 Court permits terrorists to be tried by military commissions, Washington Legal Foundation, July 15, 2005.
 Protecting America's Freedom: National Security and Defense, Washington Legal Foundation, July 15, 2005.
 "The Nation's Second-Highest Court" Upholds Military Commissions, FindLaw, July 20, 2005.
 Understanding Hamdan v. Rumsfeld
 Why Hamdan is Right about Conspiracy Liability, JURIST
 Why the Court Said No, David D. Cole, New York Review of Books, August 10, 2006.
 

2006 in United States case law
Donald Rumsfeld litigation
Extrajudicial prisoners of the United States
George W. Bush administration controversies
Guantanamo Bay captives legal and administrative procedures
Human rights case law
United States military case law
United States Supreme Court cases
United States Supreme Court cases of the Roberts Court